Diandrocarpa is a genus of ascidian tunicates in the family Styelidae.

Species within the genus Diandrocarpa include:

Species names currently considered to be synonyms:
 Diandrocarpa botryllopsis Van Name, 1902: synonym of Symplegma viride Herdman, 1886 
 Diandrocarpa brakenhielmi Michaelsen, 1904: synonym of Symplegma brakenhielmi (Michaelsen, 1904) 
 Diandrocarpa okai Redikorzev, 1916: synonym of Kukenthalia borealis (Gottschaldt, 1894) 
 Diandrocarpa stuhlmanni Michaelsen, 1904: synonym of Symplegma stuhlmanni (Michaelsen, 1904)

References

Stolidobranchia
Tunicate genera